Robert A. Altenkirch was the President of University of Alabama in Huntsville and the New Jersey Institute of Technology.

Life
Altenkirch holds a B.S. from Purdue University, a M.S. from the University of California, Berkeley, and a Ph.D. from Purdue University, all in Mechanical Engineering.  He is the author of over 50 publications and nearly 100 presentations in combustion and heat transfer and served as principal investigator for ten Space Shuttle experiments investigating the spread of fire in reduced gravity.  He is a Fellow of the American Society of Mechanical Engineers. While an undergraduate at Purdue, Altenkirch became a member of the Sigma Alpha Epsilon fraternity.

From 1988 to 1995, Altenkirch was professor of mechanical engineering and dean of the College of Engineering at Mississippi State University (MSU).  While dean of engineering at MSU, he led the effort to secure National Science Foundation (NSF) funding for the establishment of the MSU Engineering Research Center for Computational Field Simulation in 1990.  He also served as professor and chair of mechanical engineering at the University of Kentucky.  He served as professor of mechanical and materials engineering and dean of the College of Engineering and Architecture at Washington State University.

He was vice president for research at Mississippi State University. During his tenure as vice president, science and engineering expenditures, as reported to NSF, increased by 75 percent from 1997 to 2001. In addition to the research program, his responsibilities encompassed congressional relations, intellectual property management and economic development.

From 2003 until 2011, Altenkirch was the seventh president of the New Jersey Institute of Technology (NJIT). 

On September 21, 2011, Dr. Altenkirch was named the new president of the University of Alabama in Huntsville.  He retired from the position in June 2019.

References

External links
"Steve Adubato Talks with Dr. Jack Noonan and Dr. Robert Altenkirch"

Year of birth missing (living people)
Living people
Purdue University College of Engineering alumni
UC Berkeley College of Engineering alumni
Washington State University faculty
University of Kentucky faculty
Mississippi State University faculty
New Jersey Institute of Technology people
Presidents of the University of Alabama in Huntsville